Curlin (foaled March 25, 2004, in Kentucky) is an American Thoroughbred racehorse who was the American Horse of the Year in both 2007 and 2008. He retired in 2008 as the highest North American money earner with over US$10.5 million accumulated. His major racing wins included the 2007 Preakness Stakes, 2007 Breeders' Cup Classic, and 2008 Dubai World Cup. In August 2008, Timeform assigned a 134 rating for Curlin, calling him the best horse in the world on dirt. Curlin was elected to the National Museum of Racing's Hall of Fame in 2014, his first year of eligibility.

Since retired to stud, Curlin has emerged as a major sire whose offspring include Palace Malice, Keen Ice, Exaggerator, Good Magic, Stellar Wind, Vino Rosso, Clairiere, Malathaat and Nest.

Background
Curlin was sired by Smart Strike, a former star from the Sam-Son Farm racing team in Ontario, Canada. Smart Strike is a half-brother of 1991 Canadian Triple Crown winner Dance Smartly. He is out of the mare Sherriff's Deputy, a daughter of Canadian Horse of the Year and two-time North American Champion sire Deputy Minister.

The colt was named for Charles Curlin, an enslaved African American from western Kentucky who fought for the Union Army in the American Civil War. One of his original owners, Shirley Cunningham, Jr. through his interest in Midnight Cry Stables, is Charles Curlin's great-grandson.

Ownership
Kentucky-based class-action lawyers William Gallion and Shirley Cunningham Jr. bought Curlin for $57,000 as a yearling through their Midnight Cry Stable. They sold controlling interest (80%) in the horse in February 2007 for $3.5 million to a group composed of Jess Jackson, founder of Kendall-Jackson wines; Florida software entrepreneur Satish Sanan's Padua Stables; and George Bolton, an investment banker from San Francisco.

In August 2007 (after Curlin's 2007 Preakness win), Gallion and Cunningham were in a Boone County, Kentucky jail awaiting a federal trial on charges including conspiracy and fraud for allegedly stealing $90 million of a $200 million settlement they obtained for 418 people in a lawsuit against the makers of the diet drug fen-phen. They were convicted in 2009 and sentenced to 25 and 20 years in prison, respectively.

On November 1, 2007, Judge William Wehr ruled the 20% interest in the colt owned by Gallion and Cunningham Jr. would be turned over to the more than 400 persons involved in the fen-phen  lawsuit.

On November 6, 2007, Jackson and Bolton confirmed that they bought out the interest in Curlin controlled by their partner Sanan's Padua Stables (29%).

On November 9, 2007, trainer Kenneth McPeek, who worked as a blood-stock agent and consultant for Midnight Cry Stable, filed suit in Circuit Court in Jefferson County, Kentucky alleging that the stable breached a contract calling for him to be paid a 5 percent finders fee commission on the purchase and selling price of Curlin and other racehorses, as well as other breeding rights.

On December 20, 2007, Stonestreet announced the private purchase of George Bolton's 20% stake in Curlin. The sale leaves Stonestreet Stables' Jess Jackson and his wife, Barbara Banke, as co-owners of 80% of Curlin and the balance held by Midnight Cry Stables, which was tied up in a legal battle involving 418 people suing the horse's original owners over a legal settlement.

On January 22, 2008, Senior Judge Roger Crittenden in a one-sentence statement overruled the foreclosure motion filed by the plaintiffs against their former attorneys for alleged mishandling their settlement in the fen-phen lawsuit. The Blood Horse magazine further reported that according to attorneys representing Stonestreet Stable, they have "a first-right-of-refusal clause incorporated into the original sales agreement with Midnight Cry", should ever such a motion be ordered.

In May 2015, a 20% share of Curlin was auctioned off for over $6 million. This was the share that had belonged to Cunningham and Gallion, which was seized to help cover the restitution they owed their former clients. The buyer was Hill 'n' Dale Equine Holdings Inc. and Elevage II.

Racing career

2007: 3-year-old season 
Curlin was conditioned for racing by Helen Pitts. Unraced at age two, in February 2007 he won a seven-furlong maiden race for three-year-olds by 12 ¾ lengths at Gulfstream Park in Florida, after which he was purchased by a racing partnership headed by majority shareholder Jess Jackson of Stonestreet Farm. The partnership also included Padua Stables, George Bolton, and Midnight Cry Stables, Curlin's original owner. The new owners turned the colt over to trainer Steve Asmussen. Curlin went on to race at Oaklawn Park in Arkansas where in March, jockey Robby Albarado rode him to victory in the Rebel Stakes, and, in mid April, in the Arkansas Derby.

Curlin was established as the morning-line favorite by Churchill Downs official handicapper Mike Battaglia at 7–2 in spite of the fact that no horse had won the Derby with only three prior starts since 1915 (Regret), and no horse had won with no two-year-old preps since 1882. He was the second betting choice when the race went off. Breaking from post  2 in a full field of 20, Curlin finished 3rd to Street Sense and Hard Spun. In the Preakness Stakes two weeks later, Curlin stumbled out of the gate and raced by the stands the first time in sixth, well off a hot early pace.  As the leaders began to tire, he made a bold run on the far turn and entered the stretch four wide, opening the door for Street Sense to sneak by to his inside.  With one furlong to go, Street Sense opened a length and a half lead. However, Curlin rallied to beat the Kentucky Derby winner in the final stride.  His final time of 1:53.46, at the time, tied the track record set by Tank's Prospect in 1985, Louis Quatorze in 1996, and unofficially Secretariat in 1973 (Secretariat's time was later officially determined to be 1:53.00). Curlin was the even-money favorite in the Belmont Stakes.  He engaged the champion filly Rags to Riches in a lengthy stretch duel and lost by a head. Rags to Riches was the first filly to win the Belmont Stakes in over a century.

Curlin was sent off as the favorite in the $1 million Haskell Invitational at Monmouth Park on August 5, 2007, and placed 3rd behind Any Given Saturday and Hard Spun, paying $2.10 to show on a fast track.  The winning time was 1:48:35. Ridden by Robby Albarado, on September 30, he beat Lawyer Ron by a neck in a stretch duel in the Grade I Jockey Club Gold Cup at Belmont Park in a time of 2:01:20 with a Beyer rating of 114.  As the Gold Cup is a Breeders' Cup Challenge race, the win earned him an automatic berth into the Breeders Cup Classic.

On October 27, 2007, Curlin went off as the 4th betting choice in the Breeders' Cup Classic held at Monmouth Park Racetrack in Oceanport, New Jersey. The condition was listed as sloppy on the main track after several days of rain. Emerging from about midpack in the field of nine, Curlin overtook pace setter Hard Spun at the top of the stretch and drew away to win the 24th running of the Classic by 4¾ lengths over  Hard Spun. The race was the eighth time that a 3-year-old took the Classic. Curlin covered the 1 mile distance in 2:00.59, which is considered a fast time on a sloppy track, earning a Beyer rating of 119. By comparison, the Monmouth track record is 2:00.40 set in 1962 by Carry Back.

After his three-year-old campaign, Curlin was honored as the 2007 Horse of the Year as well as Three Year Old of the Year, defeating rivals Street Sense and Hard Spun.

Curlin repeated as the Eclipse Award American Horse of the Year for 2008, becoming only the fifth horse to do so and putting him in the company of the likes of Secretariat and Forego.  He also was named the American Champion Older Male Horse for 2008.

2008: 4-year-old season
Curlin began his four-year-old campaign in Dubai at the Nad Al Sheba Racecourse, running in the Jaguar Trophy Handicap as preparation for the Group I Dubai World Cup. He defeated a field of five by 2  lengths under a hand ride in 2:00.60

Curlin was sent out as the odds-on favorite for the Dubai World Cup. Drawing post 12, he ran three-wide outside of the leaders for the majority of the race before clearing the field when they reached the straight, winning by 7 lengths. He also became the only horse in Dubai World Cup history to win from the 12th post position. His official winning time was initially listed by the Dubai Racing Commission as 2:00.15, which would have been the third fastest in the race's history behind Dubai Millennium and Invasor. However, that time has since been removed after an investigation by the DRC sparked by reports by The Racing Post that their timing experts showed multiple races on the card – including Curlin in DWC – as being slower than officially reported. The Racing Post claims that five of the six Thoroughbred races, the Godolphin Mile being the exception, went a full second slower than the official timings.

On June 14, 2008, Curlin won his third start of the year, the Stephen Foster Handicap at Churchill Downs. He won by 4 lengths carrying 128 pounds (10 pounds more than the next highest weighted horse).
On July 12, 2008, Curlin finished second, two lengths behind Red Rocks in the Grade I $500,000 Man o' War Stakes at Belmont Park. The turf race, with a field of seven, was run over the distance of 1 miles. Curlin carried 116 lbs, as did Red Rocks, while 3rd place runner Better Talk Now, a previous Breeders' Cup Turf winner, toted 120 lbs.  Curlin was sent off in this maiden turf run by punters as the odds-on 2–5 favorite and a crowd of 8,428 was on hand to watch the race. On August 30, Curlin won the Woodward Stakes at Saratoga by one and a quarter lengths. However, after fast early fractions for the first mile, the final eighth of the race was run in a slower 14.01 seconds. On September 27, 2008, Curlin sent off as the 2–5 favorite and won his second consecutive Jockey Club Gold Cup, in a hand ride by three-quarters of a length over Wanderin Boy, earning a Beyer Speed figure of 111. The track was sealed and the final time was 2:01.93 was over a sloppy track.

The victory vaulted him past Cigar to become the No. 1 all-time North American money earner as defined as having at least one North American start. Curlin is the first North American runner to have earned over US$10 million. Curlin finished fourth in the 2008 Breeders' Cup Classic. Previously, trainer Steve Asmussen had expressed concern about running him in the Classic because of the Pro-Ride synthetic dirt at the 2008 host track, Santa Anita Park. Jockey Robby Albarado made what BreedersCup.com announcers described as an "early" move from near the back of the pack. Curlin blew by the frontrunners at the far turn but was overtaken in the stretch by eventual winner Raven's Pass, second-place finisher Henrythenavigator, and the late-charging Tiago.

On November 21, Curlin's owners announced that he would begin his stud career in 2009 at Lane's End in Versailles, Kentucky, for an initial fee of $75,000.  Curlin was retired and paraded at Churchill Downs on November 29, 2008.

On January 26, 2009, Curlin won the Eclipse Award for older male horse of the year and for the second year in a row was named Horse of the Year.  He joined Secretariat, Forego, Affirmed and Cigar as the only horses to win the award consecutively since the Eclipse Awards began in 1971.

Racing statistics

Stud career
Curlin covered 131 mares in the 2009 breeding season. The first foal by Curlin, a filly out of Zophie (Hawkster), was born on January 12, 2010. She was euthanized on January 29 after a paddock accident. Among other mares, Curlin was bred to the 2009 American Horse of the Year, Rachel Alexandra.  During the broadcast of the 2011 Kentucky Derby, it was announced that Rachel Alexandra was expecting a foal, due around February 2012.  A bay colt later named Jess's Dream was born on January 22, 2012, and won his first race on August 24, 2015.

Curlin was the leading third crop sire in North America in 2014. On September 2, 2015, Stonestreet Farm announced that Curlin would stand the 2016 breeding season at Hill 'n' Dale Farm. Though his offspring tend to be somewhat slow to mature, Curlin is now regarded as a source of classic stamina.

In 2016, Curlin finished second on the North American general sire list. His stud fee for 2017 was increased to $150,000.

In 2022 Curlin's fee at Hill 'n' Dale Farm was $175,000. He was the leading sire at the 2022 Breeders' Cup with three winners on the Saturday card: Malathaat in the Distaff, Cody's Wish in the Dirt Mile and Elite Power in the Sprint.

Notable progeny
Curlin has produced 20 Grade 1 winners:

'c = colt, f = filly, g = gelding

Curlin also sired champion filly Rachel Alexandra's only son, called Jess's Dream who won a stunning maiden victory before being retired from injury to stand at stud in Ocala, Florida. He sired his first stakes winner when his colt Chess's Dream won the Grade 3 Kitten's Joy Stakes in January 2021.

Pedigree

See also
List of leading Thoroughbred racehorses
List of historical horses

References

External links
 Curlin's pedigree and racing stats
 January 21, 2008 NTRA article with video titled Curlin wins top 3-year-old, Horse of the Year

2004 racehorse births
Racehorses bred in Kentucky
Racehorses trained in the United States
Preakness Stakes winners
Breeders' Cup Classic winners
Dubai World Cup winners
American Grade 1 Stakes winners
American Thoroughbred Horse of the Year
Eclipse Award winners
United States Thoroughbred Racing Hall of Fame inductees
Thoroughbred family 19-c
United States Champion Thoroughbred Sires